Older Scots refers to the following periods in the history of the Scots language

 Pre-literary Scots to 1375 
 Early Scots to 1450 
 Middle Scots to 1700

The online Dictionary of the Scots Language includes the Dictionary of the Older Scottish Tongue.

References

External links
 Dictionary of the Scots Language

Scots language